The Karachi University Business School (acronym as KUBS or K.U.B.S. Urdu: کراچی یونیورسٹی بزنس اسکول) operates under the Faculty of Management & Administrative Sciences at the University of Karachi. The school was established in 1999-2000 and was subsequently granted autonomy. Prof. Dr. Mohammad Uzair (SI) was first Dean and Project Director of KUBS.

Programs

Graduate (Morning/Evening) 
 BBA - 4 year (Morning/Evening)
 MBA - 1.5 year (Business Studies Graduates)
 MBA - 2 years
 MBA (Banking) - 3 years

References 

University of Karachi
Business schools in Pakistan